Guido Andreozzi and Facundo Argüello were crowned champions, beating Steven Diez and Enrique López-Pérez 6–2, 6–2

Seeds

Draw

Draw

References
 Main Draw

Citta di Como Challenger - Doubles
2014 Doubles